A field lacrosse game was played between Canada and Great Britain at the 1908 Summer Olympics. The game was tied 9-9 in the fourth period, before Canada scored 5 straight goals to pull ahead. Canada won 14-10 to earn their second of two gold medals, the only lacrosse gold medals given out in the Olympic Games.

Background

The game marked the second appearance of lacrosse at the Olympics, the first being at the 1904 Summer Olympics.  Only two teams competed, one fewer than in 1904: South Africa entered a team but withdrew before the draw.

Both teams held try-outs to select the players to represent their country. The Official Report notes that it was the "first time in the history of Canadian lacrosse a team had been selected from all parts of the Dominion," with players from clubs "as far apart as New Westminster and Montreal." The report also credits the British team as "by far the strongest ever put into the field" by England, though admits the sport was "not yet as well-known as it ought to be on this side of the Atlantic."

Medal table

Participants

Source:

Results

Scoring summary
FIRST QUARTER (5-1): Canada: Brennan (2), Turnbull, unknown (2); England: Buckland
SECOND QUARTER: (6-2) Canada: unknown; England: Jones
THIRD QUARTER (9-7): Canada: Turnbull (2), unknown; England: Jones (2), Buckland (3)
FOURTH QUARTER (14-10): Canada: Brennan (3), Gorman (2); England: Jones, unknown (2)

See also
Federation of International Lacrosse
World Lacrosse Championship

References

Sources
 
 

1908s
1908 Summer Olympics events
1908
1908 in lacrosse
Men's events at the 1908 Summer Olympics